The Kumtura Thousand Buddha Caves (also Qumtura) is a Buddhist cave temple site in the Autonomous Region of Xinjiang, China. The site is located some 25 km west of Kucha, Kuqa County, on the ancient Silk Road. Other famous sites nearby are the Kizilgaha caves, the Kizil Caves, Subashi Temple and the Simsim caves.

112 cave temples survive, dating from the fifth to the eleventh centuries. Damaged by occasional habitation after abandonment of the site, Kumtura was visited by a number of the early foreign expeditions to Chinese Central Asia, including the 1902 Ōtani expedition, Oldenburg, and Le Coq. The last detached several wall paintings and took them back to Berlin (now at the Museum für Asiatische Kunst).

Construction of the Dongfang Hong Hydroelectric Plant in the 1970s caused the water level of the Muzat River to rise and has increased the rate of decay of the wall paintings. Long-term preservation measures under the auspices of UNESCO began in 1999 with extensive documentation and survey work and consolidation of the conglomerate rock from which the caves are excavated. The site was among the first to be designated for protection in 1961 as a Major National Historical and Cultural Site. In 2008 Kumtula Grottoes was submitted for future inscription on the UNESCO World Heritage List as part of the Chinese Section of the Silk Road.

Gallery

See also
 Principles for the Conservation of Heritage Sites in China
 National Heritage Sites in Xinjiang
 Ah-ai Grotto
 Kizil Caves
 Bezeklik Thousand Buddha Caves
 Mogao Caves
 International Dunhuang Project

References

External links

Kumtura Thousand Buddha Caves Conservation Project (UNESCO)
Conservation of Ancient Sites on the Silk Road (1st Conference) (GCI)
Conservation of Ancient Sites on the Silk Road (2nd Conference) (GCI)
Xinjiang Cultural Relics Bureau (search term: 库木吐喇千佛洞)  
Xinjiang Travel: Reliable & Authentic Guide from Local Travel Experts

Central Asian Buddhist sites
Chinese Buddhist grottoes
Caves of Xinjiang
Silk Road
Articles needing Uyghur script or text
Religion in Xinjiang
Major National Historical and Cultural Sites in Xinjiang
Buddhist temples in Aksu Prefecture